The  is an electric multiple unit (EMU) train type operated by Tokyo subway operator Tokyo Metro on the Tokyo Metro Hanzomon Line in Tokyo, Japan, since 1981.

A total of 190 cars (19 ten-car sets) were built between 1980 and 1994 by Kawasaki Heavy Industries, Kinki Sharyo, Nippon Sharyo, and Tokyu Car Corporation.

Technical details
The train shares some design similarities with the earlier Tokyo Metro 6000 series on the Chiyoda Line and the Tokyo Metro 7000 series on the Fukutoshin Line, mainly the asymmetrical front and bodyshell with some cosmetic changes.

Original sets
 Motor output: 160 kW
 MT ratio: 6M4T
 Total train power output: 3,840 kW
 Control system: Chopper control

Refurbished (B-refurbishment) sets
 Motor output: 165 kW
 MT ratio: 5M5T
 Total train power output: 3,300 kW
 Control system: IGBT-VVVF control

Formations
, all of the 19 ten-car sets are refurbished formed as shown below, with car 1 at the Oshiage (northern) end.

Original unrefurbished sets

Cars 2, 4, and 8 each have two lozenge-type pantographs.

Refurbished sets

Cars 2, 4, and 8 each have two lozenge-type pantographs.

Interior
Cars 3 and 9 in the refurbished sets have a wheelchair space.

Underside Equipment

History
The first 8000 series trains were introduced in 1981.

From 2004, a programme of refurbishment commenced, with some sets receiving VVVF control and three-phase motors. In February 2016, set 8114 received full-colour LED destination indicators.

Withdrawal
The 8000 series trains began to be replaced by new 18000 series trains from 7 August 2021. The first set to be withdrawn, set 8107, was removed for scrapping in August 2021.

References

External links

 Tokyo Metro Hanzōmon Line 8000 series information 

Electric multiple units of Japan
8000 series
Kawasaki multiple units
Train-related introductions in 1981
Kinki Sharyo multiple units
Nippon Sharyo multiple units
1500 V DC multiple units of Japan
Tokyu Car multiple units